Mutiu Adegoke (born 10 February 1984, in Nigeria) is a Nigerian football defender who currently plays for Bayelsa United.

Career
He began his career as a defender and played with ASEC Mimosas of Ivory Coast and  FC Saint Eloi Lupopo in DR Congo, before returning to Nigeria to play for Dolphins.

International career
Adegoke is former member of the Super Eagles and earned the call-up for his comeback on 12 February 2010 after three years absence.

References

1984 births
Living people
Nigerian footballers
Yoruba sportspeople
Association football forwards
Nigeria international footballers
ASEC Mimosas players
Expatriate footballers in Ivory Coast
Nigerian expatriate footballers
Shooting Stars S.C. players
Enyimba F.C. players
Nigerian expatriate sportspeople in Ivory Coast
Expatriate footballers in the Democratic Republic of the Congo
Heartland F.C. players
Dolphin F.C. (Nigeria) players
Bayelsa United F.C. players
Sportspeople from Ibadan